Bethel School District may refer to:

Bethel School District (Oregon)
Bethel School District (Vermont)
Bethel School District (Washington)

See also
 Lower Kuskokwim School District - The school district for Bethel, Alaska